Legge's flowerpecker  (Dicaeum vincens) or the white-throated flowerpecker, is a small passerine bird. It is an endemic resident breeder in Sri Lanka. It is named after the Australian ornithologist William Vincent Legge.

The Legge's flowerpecker is a common resident breeding bird of forests and other well-wooded habitats including gardens. Two eggs are laid in a purse-like nest suspended from a tree.

Description 

The latter features reflect the importance of nectar in its diet, although berries, spiders and insects are also taken.

The male Legge's flowerpecker has blue-black upperparts, a white throat and upper breast, and yellow lower breast and belly. The female is duller, with olive-brown upperparts.

In culture

This bird appears in a one rupee Sri Lankan postal stamp.

References

 Birds of India by Grimmett, Inskipp and Inskipp,

External links
Flowerpecker videos on the Internet Bird Collection

Legge's flowerpecker
Endemic birds of Sri Lanka
Legge's flowerpecker
Taxa named by Philip Sclater